Shi Changxu (15 November 1920 – 10 November 2014) was a Chinese metallurgist. He served as vice president of the Chinese Academy of Engineering.

Biography 
Born in Xushui County, Zhili (now Baoding, Hebei), he attended National Northwestern Engineering Institute (a predecessor of Northwestern Polytechnical University) until 1945. He then studied for his master's degree in the United States, at the Missouri School of Mines and Metallurgy, before receiving a doctoral degree in 1952 from the University of Notre Dame. Shi was a recipient of the 2010 Highest Science and Technology Award. He died in Beijing at the age of 93 in 2014.

The asteroid 28468 Shichangxu, discovered in 2000, is named after him.

In 2015, he was honored as one of the "Top Ten People Touching China in 2014".

Honours 
 1980 Member of the Chinese Academy of Sciences (CAS)
 1994 Member of the Chinese Academy of Engineering (CAE)
 1995 Fellow of The World Academy of Sciences (TWAS)

Awards 
 1982 State Natural Science Award (Third Class)
 1987 State Natural Science Award (Third Class)
 1988 State Science and Technology Progress Award (First Class)
 1988 State Science and Technology Progress Award (Second Class)
 2010 Highest Science and Technology Award

References

1920 births
2014 deaths
Chinese metallurgists
Members of the Chinese Academy of Engineering
Members of the Chinese Academy of Sciences
Missouri University of Science and Technology alumni
Northwestern Polytechnical University alumni
People from Baoding
Scientists from Hebei
People of the Republic of China
Chinese expatriates in the United States